is a Japanese video game music composer and sound designer. Sometimes he was referred to as Gekko Itamura.

Neyoh is his artistic name. In 2009 he released the album African Elephant Song on iTunes.

Video games

 Mahjong Natsu Monogatari (1989) Arcade
 Tail to Nose: Great Championship (1989) Arcade
 Spinal Breakers (1990) Arcade
 Pipe Dream (1990) Arcade
 Rabio Lepus Special (1990) PC Engine
 Super Volleyball (1991) Mega Drive
 Karate Blazers (1991) Arcade
 F-1 Grand Prix (1991, 1992) Arcade, Super Famicom
 Sonic Wings (1992, 1993) Arcade, Super Famicom
 Hyper V-Ball (1992) Super Famicom
 F-1 Grand Prix Part II (1993) Super Famicom
 F-1 Grand Prix Part III (1994) Super Famicom
 SD F-1 Grand Prix (1995) Super Famicom

Discography
 African Elephant Song (2009)

See also
 List of video game musicians

References
 Neyoh at iTunes
 Neyoh at MOG
 Naoki Itamura at VGMdb
 Naoki Itamura ~ 板村直樹 （いたむら なおき） at GameMusicComposerMEMO 
Naoki Itamura at MobyGames
 Naoki Itamura at Arcade-history
Rabio Lepus Special at Video Game Den

Year of birth missing (living people)
Japanese composers
Japanese male composers
Living people
People from Hiroshima Prefecture
Video game composers